October 8 - Eastern Orthodox liturgical calendar - October 10

All fixed commemorations below celebrated on October 22 by Eastern Orthodox Churches on the Old Calendar.

For October 9th, Orthodox Churches on the Old Calendar commemorate the Saints listed on September 26.

Saints
 Righteous Forefather Abraham and his nephew righteous Lot (c. 2000 B.C.)
 Holy Apostle James, son of Alphaeus (1st century)
 Saint Demetrius, Bishop of Alexandria (231)
 Saint Publia the Confessor, Deaconess, of Antioch (361-363)
 Martyrs Juventinus and Maximinus, soldiers, at Antioch (361-363)  (see also: September 5, October 12)
 Venerables Andronicus and his wife St. Athanasia, of Egypt (6th century)  (see also: March 2 )
 Saint Peter of Galatia (9th century)

Pre-Schism Western saints
 Hieromartyr Dionysius (Denis, Dennis, Denys), Bishop of Paris, with his companions Rusticus and Eleutherius (c. 258)
 Saint Domninus of Fidenza (Donnino), martyr (304)
 Saint Gislenus (Ghislain, Guislain), a confessor and anchorite in Belgium (680)
 Saints Lambert and Valerius (Bellère, Beriher), disciples of St Gislenus in Belgium and the north of France (c. 680)
 Saint Geminus, A monk at San Paterniano de Fano in Umbria, Italy (c. 815)
 Saint Savin (Sabinus), venerated as one of the Apostles of the Lavedan, in the Pyrenees, France (c. 820)
 Saint Deusdedit, a monk at Montecassino in Italy, chosen abbot about the year 830 (836)
 Saint Gunther of Bohemia, a Bohemian hermit (1045)

Post-Schism Orthodox saints
 Blessed Stefan Lazarević, King of Serbia (1427)
 Saint Stephen the Blind, King of Serbia (1468)

New Martys and Confessors
 New Hieromartyrs Constantine Sukhov and Peter Vyatkin, Priests (1918)
 New Hieromartyr Constantine Aksenov, Priest (1937)

Other commemorations
 Icon of the Most Holy Theotokos "Korsun" (Cherson) (988)
 Icon of the Most Holy Theotokos "Assuage My Sorrow" (12th century)
 Glorification (1989) of New Hiero-confessor Tikhon (Bellavin), Patriarch of Moscow and all Russia (1925)  (see also: September 26 )
 Uncovering of the relics (1997) of New Hiero-confessor Sebastian (Fomin), Archimandrite, of Optina and Karaganda (1966)
 Uncovering of the relics (2007) of St. Job (Kundrya), Archimandrite, of Malaya Ugolka, Carpatho-Russia (1985)  (see also: July 15 )

Icon gallery

Notes

References

Sources 
 October 9/22. Orthodox Calendar (PRAVOSLAVIE.RU).
 October 22 / October 9. HOLY TRINITY RUSSIAN ORTHODOX CHURCH (A parish of the Patriarchate of Moscow).
 October 9. OCA - The Lives of the Saints.
 The Autonomous Orthodox Metropolia of Western Europe and the Americas (ROCOR). St. Hilarion Calendar of Saints for the year of our Lord 2004. St. Hilarion Press (Austin, TX). p. 75.
 The Ninth Day of the Month of October. Orthodoxy in China.
 October 9. Latin Saints of the Orthodox Patriarchate of Rome.
 The Roman Martyrology. Transl. by the Archbishop of Baltimore. Last Edition, According to the Copy Printed at Rome in 1914. Revised Edition, with the Imprimatur of His Eminence Cardinal Gibbons. Baltimore: John Murphy Company, 1916. pp. 311–312.
 Rev. Richard Stanton. A Menology of England and Wales, or, Brief Memorials of the Ancient British and English Saints Arranged According to the Calendar, Together with the Martyrs of the 16th and 17th Centuries. London: Burns & Oates, 1892. pp. 481–483.
Greek Sources
 Great Synaxaristes:  9 ΟΚΤΩΒΡΙΟΥ. ΜΕΓΑΣ ΣΥΝΑΞΑΡΙΣΤΗΣ.
  Συναξαριστής. 9 Οκτωβρίου. ECCLESIA.GR. (H ΕΚΚΛΗΣΙΑ ΤΗΣ ΕΛΛΑΔΟΣ).
  09/10/2017. Ορθόδοξος Συναξαριστής. 
Russian Sources
  22 октября (9 октября). Православная Энциклопедия под редакцией Патриарха Московского и всея Руси Кирилла (электронная версия). (Orthodox Encyclopedia - Pravenc.ru).
  9 октября по старому стилю / 22 октября по новому стилю. Русская Православная Церковь - Православный церковный календарь на 2016 год.

October in the Eastern Orthodox calendar